Alathiyur is a village in the Sendurai taluk of Ariyalur district, Tamil Nadu, India.

Demographics 
 census, Alathiyur had a total population of 4,012 with 2,199 males and 1,813 females.

References 

Villages in Ariyalur district